Juifen (elevation ) is a summit of the Karwendel range in the Austrian state of Tyrol.

Alpinism 
The Juifen is one of the most prominent peaks in the Pre-Karwendel range. The summit can be reached from Sylvenstein Dam as an alpine hike and is also a common destination in winter for ski tours or snow shoes. Mountain-bikers can get relatively close to the summit starting either from the Bächen Valley (Bächental) or from the Achen Valley (Achental), passing by the Rotwand Alp (Rotwandalm) on the western slopes.

Mountains of the Alps
One-thousanders of Austria
Mountains of Tyrol (state)